Rineloricaria microlepidota is a species of catfish in the family Loricariidae. It is native to South America, where it occurs in the Juruá River basin in Brazil. The species reaches 14.5 cm (5.7 inches) in length and is believed to be a facultative air-breather.

References 

Fish described in 1907
Taxa named by Franz Steindachner
Catfish of South America
Freshwater fish of Brazil
Loricariini